Chahlak (also Romanized as Chāhlaḵ) is a village in Bondar Rural District, Senderk District, Minab County, Hormozgan Province, Iran. At the 2006 census, its population was 57, in 12 families.

References 

Populated places in Minab County